Covered: Alive in Asia is a live album by Israel & New Breed. RCA Inspiration released the album on July 24, 2015. Israel & New Breed worked with Chris Baker, Kevin Camp, and Aaron Lindsey, in the production of this album. The album was recorded all over Asia
during early October 2014 in Singapore, Malaysia, Philippines, Indonesia, Japan, and South Korea during a tour.

Critical reception

Awarding the album five stars from Worship Leader, Jeremy Armstrong states, "Covered is devotional fine art." Dwayne Lacy, giving the album four and a half stars at New Release Today, writes, "This album has so many highlights, crazy licks,...powerful moments and declarations." Rating the album a six out of ten for Cross Rhythms, Matt McChlery says, "It is just a pity that this recording has missed an opportunity to explore cross-cultural worship in a new way."

Awards and accolades
This album was No. 2, on the Worship Leader's Top 20 Albums of 2015 list. At 58th Annual Grammy Awards, it received the award for Best Gospel Album.

Track listing

Charts

References 

2015 live albums
Grammy Award for Best Gospel Album
Israel Houghton albums